The 2013 U.S. F2000 National Championship is a season of the U.S. F2000 National Championship, an open wheel auto racing series that is the first step in IndyCar's Road to Indy ladder. It is the fourth full season of the series since its revival in 2010.

There are two classes of competition, the premier Championship Class and the lower National Class. For this season all National Class competitors will use the Formula SCCA/FE chassis. This chassis was first allowed in the National Class in 2012. Championship Class competitors will continue to use Mazda MZR powered Van Diemen F2000 chassis with a league-specified wing package. National Class competitors were previously allowed to use Van Diemen chassis with less powerful engines than the Championship Class.

Drivers and teams
(N) National Class

Race calendar and results
The race schedule was announced on October 23, 2012. Fourteen races were announced, with the possibility of up to sixteen races from adding another race to the already scheduled race meets at Sebring and Laguna Seca. Laguna Seca, Reliant Park, and Toronto are all new venues for 2013.

Championship standings

Drivers' Championships

Teams'

Footnotes

References

External links
U.S. F2000 National Championship official website

U.S. F2000 National Championship seasons
F2000 National Championship